Pimelea longifolia, also known as long-leaved pimelea and tāranga, is a small shrub native to New Zealand.

Pimelea longifolia is found from coastal to alpine environments, often in open areas in or around forest, scrub and rocky places.

References

longifolia
Flora of New Zealand